Daira Mahram railway station is a disused railway station located in Daira Mahram village, Punjab, Pakistan. The station is located between Abdul Hakim railway station and Darkhana railway station.

See also
 List of railway stations in Pakistan
 Pakistan Railways

References

External links

Railway stations in Khanewal District
Railway stations on Khanewal–Wazirabad Line
Defunct railway stations in Pakistan